Arne Braa Saatvedt (18 June 1922 – 20 October 1945) was a Norwegian police official and member of the fascist party Nasjonal Samling  who was sentenced to death and executed in 1945. 

Saatvedt was born in Meråker in Nord-Trøndelag. As a 19 year-old he volunteered the 5th SS Panzer Division Wiking and 23. SS-Panzergrenadierregiment Norge. He joined the Statspolitiet in 1943, and served as interpreter and investigator at the German Sicherheitspolizei in Lillehammer.

In the post-war legal purge he was sentenced to death on 14 August 1945, by Eidsivating Court of Appeal for illegal detention, torture, bodily harm, aggravated assault with dangerous tools and maltreatment of his own countrymen. Arne Braa Saatvedt was executed by firing squad at Akershus Fortress on 20 October 1945.

References 

1922 births
1945 deaths
People from Meråker
Members of Nasjonal Samling
Norwegian police officers
Norwegian Waffen-SS personnel
Reich Security Main Office personnel
Executed Norwegian collaborators with Nazi Germany